Finney Houses Historic District is a national historic district near Churchville, Harford County, Maryland, United States. It stretches along both sides of Glenville Road in central Harford County, Maryland. The district takes in four houses and their outbuildings erected by members of the locally important Finney family between 1821 and 1906.

It was added to the National Register of Historic Places in 1989.

References

External links
, including photo dated 1979, at Maryland Historical Trust
Boundary Map of the Finney Houses Historic District, Harford County, at Maryland Historical Trust

Historic districts in Harford County, Maryland
Historic districts on the National Register of Historic Places in Maryland
Churchville, Maryland
National Register of Historic Places in Harford County, Maryland